The 2015 season was Strømsgodset's 9th season in Tippeligaen following their promotion back to the top flight in 2006.

David Nielsen started the season as the manager, but was sacked after league round 10, having only secured 12 points. He was replaced by assistant manager Bjørn Petter Ingebretsen on 26 May 2015. Ingebretsen achieved immediate success, and took the team from 9th to 2nd after a 20-match run that secured 45 points.

In the cup they were knocked out by 2. divisjon side Kvik Halden on a penalty shootout in the third round. In the UEFA Europa League qualifications, they eliminated FK Partizani and FK Mladá Boleslav in the 1st and 2nd qualifying rounds, but lost 0–4 on aggregate versus Hajduk Split in the third qualifying round.

Review and events

Pre-season transfers
Three important players left in the winter transfer window, as well as several players who had been on loan spells.

Former Ghana international Adam Larsen Kwarasey, who had been in the club since 2007, and was the first choice goalkeeper for the last five seasons, signed for Major League Soccer club Portland Timbers after his contract expired. He was replaced by the experienced former Norway international Espen Bugge Pettersen, who had become back-up goalkeeper at Molde in the two previous seasons.

In defence, former Norway international Jarl André Storbæk, who had arrived mid-season in 2012 and been crucial to the title win in 2013, left the club after his contract expired, to become playing assistant manager for Nybergsund.  He was replaced by French left back Florent Hanin, who had been released by Lierse.

Most importantly, the hugely talented 16-year-old Norway international Martin Ødegaard was sold to Real Madrid for the record selling fee of 35 million NOK (which could rise to 70 million NOK).

Pre-season
Strømsgodset went on two training tours abroad. On 30 January, they played 0–0 in a Copa X match vs Dinamo Zagreb at La Manga, Murcia. On 6 February, they won 3–1 against Hammarby in the same cup and location.

Next, the team moved to Belek, Turkey, where they played three friendlies. They won 2–1 against CSKA Sofia on 15 February, lost 0–1 to Spartak Moscow on 21 February  and lost 1–3 to Torpedo Moscow on 25 February.

In March, Strømsgodset played four friendlies on home soil against Norwegian teams. They lost 3–5 in an away match against Odd at Skagerak Arena on 6 March, having trailed 1–5 at half-time. On 14 March, they won 3–0 at home to newly promoted Sandefjord, and repeated the score against Vålerenga one week later, when Iver Fossum scored a hattrick. Their final pre-season friendly was a 2–1 away win at Lillestrøm.

Season

League
Strømsgodset had a difficult start of the season, with away games at four of the best teams from the 2014 Tippeligaen in the first five away matches. They also hosted the long-awaited derby vs rivals Mjøndalen IF in the first home game. After just one win in the first six rounds, Strømsgodset was at 13th place in the league. After two home wins and two away losses, manager David Nielsen was fired from his job, and assistant Bjørn Petter Ingebretsen, also known as «BP», was hired as interim manager for the remainder of the season.

Ingebretsen had more luck, and the team won five of their next six matches in the league, rising to 6th position in the table after half the season had been played. The team went undefeated for the eleven final games of the season, and secured the silver medals.

Norwegian Cup
In the cup, Strømsgodset easily won the First and Second Round matches against FK Tønsberg and Kjelsås Fotball, 5–0 and 4–0, respectively. After a goalless draw in the Third Round, Strømsgodset were surprisingly eliminated by Kvik Halden on a 2-4 penalty shootout. The latter club thus won its third match on penalties, and advanced to the Fourth Round, whereas Strømsgodset yet again failed to advance from the Third Round.

Europe
Through their 4th place in 2014 Tippeligaen, Strømsgodset had secured a spot in the first qualifying round of the 2015–16 UEFA Europa League. On 22 June 2015, Strømsgodset was drawn against Albanian club FK Partizani Tirana, who had qualified through their 3rd place in the 2014–15 Albanian Superliga.  The original draw had the Albanians playing at home first, but this was reversed by UEFA due to security reasons. The first leg, played at home on 2 July, ended with a 3–1 win to Strømsgodset. The second leg ended with a 1–0 win for Strømsgodset, after a late goal by Petter Vaagan Moen.

FK Mladá Boleslav awaited in the 2nd qualifying round. After a 2–1 win away, the 0–1 home defeat meant that Strømsgodset advanced to the third round on the away goals rule. They faced Hajduk Split, but were eliminated win 0–2 defeats both away and home.

Match results

Legend

Pre-season

Tippeligaen

League table

Norwegian Cup

Europa League

Player details

Transfers

Winter

In:

Out:

Summer

In:

 

Out:

Team kit
The official kit manufacturer for Strømsgodset is Diadora. This is the final year of the five-year-deal from 2011. The home shirt is deep blue, while the shorts and socks are white. The away kit has the reverse colours, with a white shirt and deep blue shorts and socks.

The main sponsor since June 2014 is the nationwide bank DNB in June.

Awards

See also
Associated Wikipedia articles
2015 in Norwegian football

References

Strømsgodset Toppfotball seasons
Stromsgodset